"Freddie's Dead" is a song by Curtis Mayfield. It was the first single from his 1972 soundtrack album for the film Super Fly. The single was released before the Super Fly album, and before the film was in theaters. The song peaked at #4 on the U.S. Billboard Hot 100 and #2 on the R&B chart. Billboard ranked it as the No. 82 song for 1972.

The song laments the death of Fat Freddie, a character in the film who is run over by a car.

Like most of the music from the Super Fly album, "Freddie's Dead" appears in the film only in an instrumental arrangement, without any lyrics. The song's music is featured prominently in the film's opening sequence and also recurs at several other points. Because of this usage the song was subtitled "Theme from Superfly" on its single release (but not on the album). It is not to be confused with "Superfly", a different song and the second single released from the Super Fly album. The arrangement is driven by a strong bass line, wah wah guitars, and a melancholy string orchestration.

The song was nominated for a Grammy Award in the category Best Rhythm & Blues Song but lost to "Papa Was a Rollin' Stone". "Freddie's Dead" was ruled ineligible for the Academy Award for Best Original Song because its lyrics are not sung in the film Super Fly.

Chart history

Weekly charts

Year-end charts

Covers and parodies
The 1973 MFSB album features an instrumental cover of the song.
"Freddie's Dead" was sampled in the 1973 break-in record, "Super Fly Meets Shaft" (US #31).
The 1988 Fishbone album Truth and Soul features a cover of the song.
Master P recorded "Kenny's Dead", a parody of Mayfield's song for the television show South Park, featuring the character Kenny McCormick, for Chef Aid: The South Park Album.

References

External links
 

1972 songs
1972 singles
Film theme songs
Curtis Mayfield songs
Songs written by Curtis Mayfield
Songs about death
Songs about fictional male characters
Songs written for films
Song recordings produced by Curtis Mayfield